The Taiwan bullfinch (Pyrrhula owstoni) is a species of finch in the family Fringillidae. It is endemic to the mountains of Taiwan. It was previously considered a subspecies of the grey-headed bullfinch (P. erythaca) and most authorities consider it as such, but a 2020 study found it to represent a distinct species that diverged from the mainland Asian P. erythaca during the mid-Pleistocene, and the International Ornithological Congress accepted it as such.

References 

Pyrrhula
Endemic birds of Taiwan
Birds described in 1907
Taxa named by Walter Rothschild
Taxa named by Ernst Hartert